John Riccitiello is an American business executive who is chief executive officer (CEO) of Unity Technologies. Previously, he served as CEO, chief operating officer and president of Electronic Arts, and co-founded private equity firm Elevation Partners in 2004. Riccitiello has served on several company boards, including those of the Entertainment Software Association, the Entertainment Software Rating Board, the Haas School of Business and the USC School of Cinematic Arts.

Early life and education 
John Riccitiello was born in Erie, Pennsylvania. He earned his Bachelor of Science degree from the University of California, Berkeley's Haas School of Business in 1981.

Career 
Early in his career, Riccitiello worked at Clorox and PepsiCo, and served as managing director of the Häagen-Dazs division of Grand Metropolitan. He was named president and chief executive officer (CEO) of Wilson Sporting Goods, as well as chairman of MacGregor Golf, in late 1993. He then served as president and CEO of Sara Lee Corporation's Sara Lee Bakery Worldwide unit, from March 1996 to September 1997.

Riccitiello joined video game company Electronic Arts (EA) in October 1997, initially serving as president and chief operating officer until 2004. He left the company to co-found and serve as partner of Elevation Partners, a private equity firm specializing in entertainment and media businesses, along with Roger McNamee and Bono. Riccitiello returned to EA to serve as CEO from February 2007 to March 2013, when the board of directors accepted his resignation because of the company's financial performance. Following EA, he worked as an advisor to startup companies and became an early investor in Oculus VR.

Riccitiello became CEO of Unity Technologies in late 2014, having previously consulted for and joined the technology company's board in November 2013. During his tenure, he has overseen two fundraising rounds, raising $181 million in 2016 and $400 million in 2017. He has also worked to get Unity's game engine into Oculus' software development kit. Riccitiello has led efforts to develop the use of Unity's software tools beyond gaming, in industries such as automotive design, construction, and filmmaking.

Board service 
Riccitiello chaired the Entertainment Software Association and Entertainment Software Rating Board during the early 2010s. He has served on the Haas School of Business' board, as well as the Board of Councilors for the University of Southern California's USC School of Cinematic Arts.

Recognition 
Riccitiello was ranked number 39 on Sports Illustrated 2013 list of the "50 Most Powerful People in Sports".

Litigation 
On 5 June 2019, Anne Evans, formerly vice-president in human resources for Unity Technologies, filed a sexual harassment and wrongful termination lawsuit against the company. Unity Technologies responded that Evans' allegations were false and that she had been terminated due to misconduct and lapse in judgment.

On September 10, 2019, the Superior Court of California issued a court order granting Unity’s motion to compel arbitration and stay all proceedings.

Personal life 
Riccitiello has two daughters, a step-son, a step-daughter and has lived in various cities for work, including the U.S. cities of Birmingham, Alabama, Chicago, New York City, and San Francisco, as well as Düsseldorf, London, Nicosia, and Paris. He has been described as "politically active", and donated to Barack Obama's 2008 presidential campaign. Riccitiello delivered a commencement speech at his alma mater in 2011.

References

Further reading 
 
 
 

1950s births
American chief executives of food industry companies
American chief executives of manufacturing companies
American chief operating officers
American company founders
American technology chief executives
Electronic Arts employees
Haas School of Business alumni
Living people
People from Erie, Pennsylvania
PepsiCo people
Video game businesspeople